Thallium(I) sulfate (Tl2SO4) or thallous sulfate is the sulfate salt of thallium in the common +1 oxidation state, as indicated by the Roman numeral I. It is often referred to as simply thallium sulfate.

Uses
During the last two centuries, Tl2SO4 had been used for various medical treatments but was abandoned. In the later 1900s it found use mainly for rodenticides.  These applications were prohibited in 1975 in the US due to the nonselective nature of its toxicity. Thallium(I) sulfate inhibits the growth of plants by preventing germination. Tl2SO4 is mostly used today as a source of Tl+ in the research laboratory. It is a precursor to thallium(I) sulfide (Tl2S), which exhibits high electrical conductivity when exposed to infrared light.

Preparation
Thallium(I) sulfate is produced by the reaction of thallium metal with sulfuric acid followed by crystallization.

Structure
Tl2SO4 adopts the same structure as K2SO4. In aqueous solution, the thallium(I) cations and the sulfate anions are separated and highly solvated. Thallium(I) sulfate crystals have a C2 symmetry.

Toxicity
Thallium(I) sulfate is soluble in water and its toxic effects are derived from the thallium(I) cation. The mean lethal dose of thallium(I) sulfate for an adult is about 1 gram. Since thallium(I) sulfate is a simple powder with indistinctive properties, it can easily be mistaken for more innocuous chemicals. It can enter the body by ingestion, inhalation, or through contact with the skin. The thallium(I) cation is very similar to potassium and sodium cations, which are essential for life. After the thallium ion enters the cell, many of the processes that transport potassium and sodium are disrupted. Due to its poisonous nature, many western countries have banned the use of thallium(I) sulfate in products for home use and many companies have also stopped using this compound.

A dosage in excess of 500 mg is reported as fatal.  Thallium(I) sulfate, after entering the body, concentrates itself in the kidneys, liver, brain, and other tissues in the body.

Thallium(I) sulfate was used in Israel to control the rodent population; it is suspected that in the 1950s, this resulted in the disappearance of the brown fish owl.

Sources
Saha A. Thallium toxicity: A growing concern. Indian J Occup Environ Med 2005;9:53-56

References

External links
International Chemical Safety Card 0336
NIOSH Pocket Guide to Chemical Hazards
Pesticide Data Sheet (WHO/FAO)
 Kaunas University of Technology
 University of Wisconsin-Madison Chemistry Department
Smithsonian National Zoological Park
ISIS Conducting Chemical Weapons Tests on Live Victims

Thallium(I) compounds
Sulfates
Rodenticides